Jackie L. Tegart (born 1956) is a Canadian politician, who was elected to the Legislative Assembly of British Columbia in the 2013 provincial election. She represents the electoral district of Fraser-Nicola as a member of the British Columbia Liberal Party.

Prior to her election, Tegart served three terms on the municipal council of Ashcroft, and was on school board for 17 years.

Election history

References

British Columbia Liberal Party MLAs
Women MLAs in British Columbia
British Columbia municipal councillors
British Columbia school board members
Women municipal councillors in Canada
Living people
Year of birth uncertain
21st-century Canadian politicians
21st-century Canadian women politicians
1956 births